Calathus is a proposed student-designed Ceres sample-return mission, that would consist of an orbiter and a lander with an ascent module. The orbiter would be equipped with a camera, a thermal imager, and a radar; the lander will have a sampling arm, a camera, and a gas chromatograph mass spectrometer. Mission objective is to return maximum 40 g of Ceresian soil. The mission was designed and proposed in 2018 with support of ESA.

Spacecraft should take samples from Occator Crater, that was studied and photographed by NASA's Dawn. The objectives are:
 to understand whether Ceres contains the ingredients for life
 to understand where Ceres was formed
 to understand whether asteroids like Ceres were responsible for delivering water and organics to Earth

Further reading

References 

Proposed space probes
Ceres (dwarf planet)
Missions to dwarf planets
Missions to main-belt asteroids